Ronald Wright (born 1948, London, England) is a Canadian author who has written books of travel, history and fiction.  His nonfiction includes the bestseller Stolen Continents, winner of the Gordon Montador Award and chosen as a book of the year by The Independent and the Sunday Times. His first novel, A Scientific Romance, won the 1997 David Higham Prize for Fiction and was chosen a book of the year by the Globe and Mail, the Sunday Times, and the New York Times.

Early life and education 
He studied archaeology at Cambridge University and later at the University of Calgary, where he was awarded an honorary doctorate in 1996.

Career 
Wright has a background in archaeology, history, linguistics, anthropology and comparative culture. He has written both fiction and non-fiction books dealing with anthropology and civilizations. 

Wright was selected to give the 2004 Massey Lectures. His contribution, A Short History of Progress, looks at the modern human predicament in light of the 10,000-year experiment with civilization.  In it he concludes that human civilization, to survive, would need to become environmentally sustainable, with specific reference to global warming and climate change.

His second book What is America?: A Short History of the New World Order continues the thread begun in A Short History of Progress by examining what Wright calls "the Columbian Age" and consequently the nature and historical origins of modern American imperium. Wright traces the origins of the ideas behind A Short History of Progress to the material he studied while writing A Scientific Romance and his 2000 essay for The Globe and Mail titled "Civilization is a Pyramid Scheme" about the fall of the ninth-century Mayan civilization. His book The Gold Eaters was a novel set during the Spanish invasion of the Inca Empire in the 1520s–1540s, was published in 2015. His 1992 non-fiction book Stolen Continents was awarded the 1993 Gordon Montador Award from the Writers' Trust of Canada and his 1997 novel A Scientific Romance, about a museum curator who travels into the future and investigates the fate of the human race, won the David Higham Prize for Fiction for first-time novelists. The novel, Henderson's Spear, published in 2001, was about a jailed filmmaker piecing together her family history in Polynesia.

Wright is a contributor to the Times Literary Supplement, and has written and presented documentaries for radio and television on both sides of the Atlantic.

Bibliography

Novels

Non-fiction

Awards
 1986 Canadian Science Writers' Association Award, for "The Lamanai Enigma"
 1990 Shortlist, Trillium Book Award, for Time Among the Maya
 1991 Canadian Broadcasting Corporation Literary Award, for "Going to the Wall"
 1992 Nominated, Author of the Year, CBA Libris Award, for Stolen Continents
 1993 Gordon Montador Award, for Stolen Continents
 1995 The Globe and Mail Editor's Choice, for A Scientific Romance
 1996 Honorary Doctorate, University of Calgary
 1997 David Higham Prize for Fiction for A Scientific Romance
 1998 The Sunday Times (UK) Book of the Year, for A Scientific Romance
 2005 Finalist, British Columbia Achievement Foundation Award for Canadian Non-Fiction, for A Short History of Progress 
 2005 CBA Libris Award, "Non-Fiction Book of the Year," for A Short History of Progress

Personal life 
In 2004, Wright moved from Ontario to one of the Gulf Islands in British Columbia.

See also
 Societal collapse

References

External links
Official Website, Ronald Wright
British Columbia Achievement Foundation Award biography of Ronald Wright as a finalist for Canadian non-fiction in 2005
Massey Lecture: A Short History of Progress,, Ronald Wright, 2017

1948 births
Living people
Canadian male novelists
20th-century Canadian historians
Canadian male non-fiction writers
21st-century Canadian historians
British emigrants to Canada